The Nauruan Civil War was fought from 1878 to 1888, between forces loyal to incumbent King Aweida of Nauru and those seeking to depose him in favour of a rival claimant. The war was preceded by the introduction of firearms to the island and its inhabitants, Nauruans, as a whole. For the majority of the war, the loyalists and the rebels found themselves in a stalemate, with one side controlling the northern and the other the southern part of the island. 

In 1888, the German Empire intervened by restoring Aweida to the throne and confiscating combatants' firearms; by the time they had finished, the German soldiers had confiscated 791 rifles from both belligerents, nearly one gun per every remaining living inhabitant of the island. By historical estimates, Nauru had a population of approximately 1,400 during the height of the war, while by the end of it there were some 900 native inhabitants left (i.e. over one third of island's population perished as a consequence of the conflict).

Having effectively been put under German control with the civil war's ceasefire, Nauru was shortly thereafter annexed into the German colonial empire, as part of German New Guinea.

Background
When the British captain John Fearn came to Nauru in 1798, the island had been avoided by sailors, due to its notoriety as a station for pirates. Nevertheless, in the 19th century, the immigration of Europeans, often lawbreakers, steadily increased. Traditional life had been disrupted by the introduction of firearms and spirits, an unknown form of alcoholic drink in ancient Nauru, although the Nauruans consumed palm wine for several thousand years.

Course of the war

Outbreak
The conflict began during a marriage festival; while discussing a point of etiquette, which turned into a heated argument, one of the guests fired a pistol and shot a young chief. The need to avenge the young chief's death was perceived as clear in a Nauruan cultural context. Former feuds had their origins in similar incidents, but this time every family in every tribe's clan had guns, exacerbating a potential conflict. Moreover, the Nauruans were goaded by the beachcombers, released convicts and dismissed whalers from Europe. Several deadly shootings led to most Nauruans participating in the war. The conflict saw the island divided into a north and south.

War reports
A squadron of the British Royal Navy anchored off the coast of Nauru on September 21, 1881, and the squadron's flagship approached the island, to appraise the local situation. An acculturated local beachcomber, William Harris, boarded the British ship, which summoned the rest of the squadron by semaphore that evening, saying that a tribal war was raging, that all of the islanders were drunk, that the actual king of the island, Aweida, wished to have missionaries come to the island to help stop the war.

Six years later, an Auckland-dwelling British sea captain named Frederick Moss came in his schooner, the Buster, landing on Nauru while his ship was being reloaded with copra. He reported that the inhabitants of Nauru were friendly and of good humor, although most of the boys and all of the men were armed with rifles and carbines. The war was still going on, although by this time it appeared that many of the islanders had had enough. Through his conversations with the natives, Moss noted that none of them wished to continue fighting, but no tribal group trusted the others to lay down their arms if it did so first. They wished for universal disarmament of the island. Moss received another report from Harris, who still lived on the island. Harris said that two of his family members had already been shot and that he wished a Christian mission would come to the island to restore peace once again.

German annexation and end of the war

The war helped neither the island's copra production nor the interests and securities of the German merchants, who had established cocoa plantations and other agricultural establishments. Because the political stability of the island affected the German holdings there directly, German authorities recommended that Germany should take over the administration of the island, which they did. Germany annexed the island on April 16, 1888, banning both alcohol and firearms. On October 1 of that year, the German gunboat SMS Eber, with 87 men, anchored off the coast of Nauru. The armed German seamen met with Harris and returned with the first European settlers, as well as a Christian missionary from the Gilbert Islands. The next morning, October 2, saw the arrest of the remaining tribal chiefs and the German annexation ceremony, complete with the hoisting of the German flag. German authorities declared that unless all firearms and munitions were turned over to the German government in one day, the chiefs would be executed; the next morning, the natives of the island turned over 765 weapons and several thousand rounds of ammunition, ending the bloodiest tribal war in Nauruan history.

Aftermath
The annexation of Nauru by German Empire brought about a lasting ceasefire. After the annexation, King Aweida nominally retook the throne as a subject to the German New Guinea. In 1914, German Empire lost possession of the island in a bloodless transfer of power to Australia which was reaffirmed with the 1918 peace treaty. After World War II, Nauru became a United Nations trust territory, i.e. the Trust Territory of Nauru, under Australian sponsorship and in 1968 gained full independence as a sovereign state.

References

 Military History – The Smallest Conflict in History

See also
 History of Nauru

Civil wars involving the states and peoples of Oceania
Civil wars of the Industrial era
Wars of succession involving the states and peoples of Oceania
History of Nauru
Wars involving Nauru
1870s in Nauru
1880s in Nauru
Conflicts in 1878
Conflicts in 1879
Conflicts in 1880
Conflicts in 1881
Conflicts in 1882
Conflicts in 1883
Conflicts in 1884
Conflicts in 1885
Conflicts in 1886
Conflicts in 1887
Conflicts in 1888
1880s conflicts